Jason Tham is an Indian dancer, choreographer and actor. He was a contestant on the reality dance competition Just Dance in India and played the role of Karma on Channel V dance-based show Dil Dosti Dance.

Early life
Tham was born the youngest of three children in New York, USA to Chinese parents who moved to Delhi, India when he was young. He did his schooling from Don Bosco New Delhi and graduated from Stratford University in 2011. His parents own businesses in New Delhi, India. He started learning to dance in 2008 and is a self-taught actor, dancer and choreographer. He participated in a number of reality TV shows including Just Dance, Dance India Dance, AXN's India's minute to win it season 2 and NDTV's Swiss made dreams. Tham then moved to Mumbai in 2013 to further his career in the entertainment industry.

Just dance
Jason Tham competed on the Star Plus reality dance competition, Just Dance. He was the Top 21 contestants of Just Dance 2011. He appeared as a Dance Choreographer in Dance India Dance season 4 and Boogie Woogie.

Acting career

Filmography
 2014: Happy New Year
 2016: Baaghi
 2018: Race 3
 2018: Happy Phirr Bhag Jayegi
 2019: Bharat
 2022: Rocket Gang

Television

References

External links
 Jason Tham

American male dancers
American people of Chinese descent
Indian male dancers
Indian people of Chinese descent
Living people
Year of birth missing (living people)